Lesbian, gay, bisexual, and transgender (LGBT) persons in Anguilla face legal challenges not experienced by non-LGBT residents. Same-sex sexual activity is legal in Anguilla, but same-sex couples cannot marry or obtain civil partnerships. Anguillian law does not forbid discrimination based on sexual orientation or gender identity.

Law regarding same-sex sexual activity
Same-sex sexual activities have been legal in Anguilla since 2001. The legalisation of homosexuality was the result of an order of the Privy Council of the United Kingdom and affected the laws in four other overseas territories of the United Kingdom. 

The age of consent is higher for homosexuals (18) than it is for heterosexuals (16).

Recognition of same-sex relationships

Same-sex marriage and civil unions are not legal in Anguilla, and it is one of the British overseas territories not to have legislated for civil partnerships. Non-legal ceremonies of same-sex couples have occurred on the island.

The Marriage Act states that "'marriage' means the union of a man and a woman as husband and wife".

Discrimination protections
No known legislative protections exist for LGBT people in Anguilla's local laws. The Constitution of Anguilla outlaws discrimination on the basis of "race, political opinions, colour, creed, sex or place of origin", though makes no mention of sexual orientation or gender identity.

Living conditions
Due to Anguilla's small population, there is virtually no gay scene on the island. There are no gay organisations, venues, bars and clubs, or pride events. A small protest occurred on 17 May 2011 in The Valley for the International Day Against Homophobia, Transphobia and Biphobia.

Several same-sex couples who have travelled to the island on vacation report that the island is "gay-friendly" and has "warm people, the best beaches and sunset in the world, and fantastic restaurants", but also "very quiet". The couples further said that "nobody was discriminatory in any way". However, the situation for locals might be different. Anguilla, much like other Caribbean islands, is believed to have a "subdued and subtle climate of homophobia", which has contributed to secrecy among LGBT locals.

Summary table

See also

 LGBT rights in the Americas
 LGBT rights in the United Kingdom
 Recognition of same-sex unions in the British Overseas Territories

References

Society of Anguilla
Anguilla
Anguilla